Kalles Fraktaler is a free Windows-based fractal zoom computer program  used for zooming into fractals such as the Mandelbrot set and the Burning Ship fractal at very high speed, utilizing Perturbation and Series Approximation.

Functionality 
Kalles Fraktaler focuses on zooming into fractals. This is possible in the included fractal formulas such like the Mandelbrot set, Burning ship or so called "TheRedshiftRider" fractals. Many tweaks can visualize phenomena better or solve glitches concerning the calculation issues. Other functions are color seeds, slopes for showing iteration depths or entering location parameters in the complex plane. The via zooming reached location can be saved as a KFR file. The rendered image can be saved or be a part of a zoom sequence, which can be later used for a fractal zoom video.

Fork 

The program got forked to Kalle's Fraktaler 2+ with additional functions. The newest release is 2.15.1.6 from 2020/12/08 (December 12, 2020). The license is AGPLv3+.

Some additional functions are:
 Gaussian jitter
 New calculation techniques
 New fractal formulas
 Hybrid formula creator

References

External links
 Kalles Fraktaler homepage
 Kalles Fraktaler compiled with GMP by Claude Heiland-Allen
 Kalles Fraktaler discussion forum
 Kalles Fraktaler 2 + GMP discussion forum

Fractal software
Windows software